Simone Denise Hindmarch married name Bye (born 1968), is a female former swimmer who competed for England.

Swimming career
Hindmarch represented England in the 100 and 200 metres backstroke event and won a gold medal in the 4 x 100 metres medley relay, at the 1986 Commonwealth Games in Edinburgh, Scotland.

References

1968 births
English female swimmers
Swimmers at the 1986 Commonwealth Games
Living people
Commonwealth Games medallists in swimming
Commonwealth Games gold medallists for England
Medallists at the 1986 Commonwealth Games